Phytomedicine is a monthly peer-reviewed medical journal covering the fields of phytotherapy, phytomedicine, and toxicology of plants and their extracts. The journal was established in 1994. It is published by Elsevier and the editor-in-chief is Alexander Panossian (Swedish Herbal Institute).

Abstracting and indexing 
The journal is abstracted and indexed in:

According to the Journal Citation Reports, the journal had a 2021 impact factor of 6.656.

References

External links
 

Publications established in 1994
Pharmacology journals
Monthly journals
Elsevier academic journals
English-language journals
Herbalism